The Cloisters is the branch of the Metropolitan Museum of Art dedicated to the art and architecture of the European Middle Ages.

The Cloisters may also refer to:

 The Cloisters (Letchworth), a listed  building in Hertfordshire, England
 The Cloisters (Lutherville, Maryland), an historic house in the US
 The Cloisters, Perth, a building in Western Australia, Australia
 The Cloisters, Salisbury, a public house in Salisbury, Wiltshire, England
 The Cloisters, University of Adelaide, South Australia

See also
 Cloister, a covered walk, open gallery, or open arcade
 Cloister (disambiguation)